Velay is a historical area of France situated in east Haute-Loire département and south east of Massif central.

History 
Julius Caesar mentioned the vellavi  as subordinate of the arverni. Strabon suggested that they might have made secession from the arverni and Ptolemy located them as vellauni.

The country is well delimited by natural obstacles: Allier river in the south, Mount Boutières and Mézenc on the east, Mount Devès on the west. Devès has Celtic toponyms clearly suggesting an antic border  (Fix from finis; la Durande from Gaulish Equiranda meaning frontier).

No explanation concerning the toponym, except 19th century's naïve scholastic ones that connected the name to PIE root wel (land of "well ... people") or even to the mythological Hel (“land or mountains of the hell” referring to the volcanic geology).

Middle Ages 

The first mention of a county of Velay was in 1142.

By the beginning of the 10th century, Le Puy-en-Velay had supplanted Ru-Essio (Saint-Paulien) as religious and administrative capital of the Velay.

In 1162, Velay became an independent county, with its bishop as count reporting directly to the King.

Velay was divided into eighteen baronies. From the mid 14th century  it was part of Languedoc but kept its own States General until 1789. During the same period, it was a crossroads of pilgrimage trails.

Modern period 
In the beginning of the 16th century Velay was wealthy, but the religious wars ruined the country. Le Puy was ardently catholic but the extreme south east of Velay was deeply Protestant. It is still nowadays the most Protestant area of France.

Velay ceased to exist after the French Revolution on March 4, 1790. The department of Haute-Loire was created from the former county of Velay, on top of it a portion of Auvergne, Gévaudan and Vivarais are added.

The first part of Travels with a Donkey in the Cévennes (1879( from Robert Louis Stevenson is entitled Velay, the country being the starting point of the writer's trip.

The name is kept for geographical terms (Mounts of the Velay) or new French geographical administrative entity (Communautés de communes du Velay).

References 
Sources
 Francisque Mandet, Histoire du Velay (1862) ,
Christian Lauranson-Rosaz, L'Auvergne et ses marges (Velay, Gévaudan) du VIIIe au XIe siècle. La fin du monde antique ?, Le Puy-en-Velay, éd. des , 1987, rééd. 2007

The Annotated Travels with a Donkey in the Cévennes, at Wikisource.

 
Former provinces of France
Languedoc
Geography of Haute-Loire